Asetrad (abbreviation for the "Asociación Española de Traductores, Correctores e Intérpretes" or the "Spanish Association of Translators, Copy-editors, and Interpreters") is an association based in Spain to support and facilitate the work of translators, copy-editors, and interpreters.

It is a member of the International Federation of Translators (FIT).

Asetrad has an online publication, La Linterna del Traductor.

References

External links
Official website
Asetrad in English

Translation associations of Spain
Organizations established in 2003
2003 establishments in Spain